Jacqueline Bertrand (born 1929) is a French former swimmer. She competed in the women's 200 metre breaststroke at the 1948 Summer Olympics.

References

External links
 

1929 births
Possibly living people
Olympic swimmers of France
Swimmers at the 1948 Summer Olympics
Place of birth missing (living people)
French female breaststroke swimmers